Staythorpe C Power Station is a 1,735 MWe gas-fired power station at Staythorpe between Southwell and Newark-on-Trent in Nottinghamshire, England, between the River Trent and Nottingham to Lincoln railway line. The station was handed over to the owner RWE from Alstom Power with full commercial operation being achieved in December 2010. The official opening ceremony attended by Charles Hendry, Minister of State took place on 9 May 2011.

The £680 million plant is owned by the German energy company, RWE. It is the second largest Combined Cycle Gas Turbine (CCGT) power station in the UK and has an overall efficiency in excess of 58%.

History

Staythorpe C was built on the site of two former CEGB coal-fired power stations, the 360 MW Staythorpe A and the 360 MW Staythorpe B.

Staythorpe A (1950–1983)
Staythorpe A was authorised in 1946 and commenced by Derbyshire & Nottinghamshire Electric Power Company. In 1948, electricity supply was nationalised, and the station became the responsibility of the British Electricity Authority (1948-1955) then the Central Electricity Authority (1955-1957) and finally the Central Electricity Generating Board (1958-1990). Staythorpe A was first commissioned in March 1950. It had six 60 MW British Thomson-Houston turbo-alternators giving a gross capability of 360 MW and a net generating capability of 336 MW. The second set was commissioned in July 1950, followed by the other units in April 1952, December 1953, December 1955 and August 1956. The 16 coal-fired Babcock and Wilcox CTM Highhead spreader stoker boilers produced a maximum of 480 kg/s of steam delivered to the turbines at 62.1 bar and 482 °C. Cooling of the station was by river water. The station had three chimneys.The architect was T. Cecil Howitt FRIBA and the consulting engineers Balfour, Beatty & Co Ltd. 

The electricity output, in GWh, is shown in the graph and the installed capacity and output of the power station are shown in the table.

The station was closed on 31 October 1983 and had a generating capacity of 112 MW.

Staythorpe B (1962–1994)
Staythorpe B was commissioned in May 1962 by the Central Electricity Generating Board. It had three 120 MW Metropolitan Vickers  turbo-alternators giving a gross generating capability of 360 MW and a net capability of 336 MW. The John Brown pulverised fuel boilers produced a maximum of 324 kg/s of steam delivered to the turbines at 103.4 bar and 538 °C. Staythorpe B was one of the CEGB’s twenty steam power stations with the highest thermal efficiency; in 1963–4 the thermal efficiency was 33.28 per cent, 33.54 per cent in 1964–5, and 33.83 per cent in 1965–6. Cooling of the station was by river water and cooling towers constructed by Davenport Engineering. The station had a single chimney. The annual electricity output of Staythorpe B was:

Staythorpe B closed in 1994 with a generating capacity of 354 MW.

There is still a large substation next to the  site of the former power stations, and a monument. Staythorpe B power station was supplied with coal via a branch off the adjacent Nottingham and Lincoln railway line. Rail facilities included a west-facing junction on the mainline, eleven sidings, a coal hopper, a locomotive shed and a run-round loop.

The cooling water system enabled the abstraction of up to 104,600 m3/h (23 million gallons per hour) of water from the River Trent.

Staythorpe C

Planning process
Planning permission was given for the gas-fired power station as early as 1993, and construction originally began in 1998 by the previous owner National Power, temporarily ceasing in 2000 due to market saturation and low returns on electricity generation (high gas costs versus low electricity prices). Construction restarted in early 2008, after RWE decided to proceed with Staythorpe in May 2007 in preference to development at an alternate site at Pembroke Power Station in Wales. The Pembroke site was given the go ahead to proceed alongside Staythorpe in February 2009 once environmental conditions were assured to be met. The project at Staythorpe will be constructed under an Engineering, procurement and construction (EPC) contract by Alstom Power.

The electricity 400 kV ZA transmission line from Staythorpe to Grendon, Northamptonshire was upgraded for the new power station.

Resourcing of construction labour

The GMB and Unite trade unions demonstrated at the station when Alstom recruited non-UK contract labour to build the power station.

Specification
Staythorpe is a CCGT power station that runs primarily on natural gas, but has the theoretical (not commissioned) option to switch to (distillate) light fuel oil. It was designed to generate enough electricity for two million homes with four KA26-1 modules each generating around 430 MWe, each with an Alstom 288 MWe  GT26B gas turbine, triple-pressure heat recovery steam generator and steam turbine. Electricity is generated using Alstom TOPGAS hydrogen-cooled generators. The plant was designed for a thermal efficiency of around 58%.

References

External links

 RWE npower
 Former power station
 Power in Trust monument

Energy infrastructure completed in 2010
Proposed natural gas-fired power stations
Natural gas-fired power stations in England
Buildings and structures in Nottinghamshire
Power stations in the East Midlands
RWE